Federico Faggin (born 1 December 1941) is an Italian physicist, engineer, inventor and entrepreneur. He is best known for designing the first commercial microprocessor, the Intel 4004. He led the 4004 (MCS-4) project and the design group during the first five years of Intel's microprocessor effort. Faggin also created, while working at Fairchild Semiconductor in 1968, the self-aligned MOS (metal–oxide–semiconductor) silicon-gate technology (SGT), which made possible MOS semiconductor memory chips, CCD image sensors, and the microprocessor. After the 4004, he led development of the Intel 8008 and 8080, using his SGT methodology for random logic chip design, which was essential to the creation of early Intel microprocessors. He was co-founder (with Ralph Ungermann) and CEO of Zilog, the first company solely dedicated to microprocessors, and led the development of the Zilog Z80 and Z8 processors. He was later the co-founder and CEO of Cygnet Technologies, and then Synaptics.

In 2010, he received the 2009 National Medal of Technology and Innovation, the highest honor the United States confers for achievements related to technological progress. In 2011, Faggin founded the Federico and Elvia Faggin Foundation to support the scientific study of consciousness at US universities and research institutes. In 2015, the Faggin Foundation helped to establish a $1 million endowment for the Faggin Family Presidential Chair in the Physics of Information at UC Santa Cruz to promote the study of "fundamental questions at the interface of physics and related fields including mathematics, complex systems, biophysics, and cognitive science, with the unifying theme of information in physics." Federico Faggin has been a Silicon Valley resident since 1968 and is a naturalized US citizen.

Education and early career
Born in Vicenza, Italy, Federico grew up in an intellectual environment. His father, Giuseppe Faggin, was a scholar who wrote many academic books and translated, with commentaries, the Enneads of Plotinus from the original Greek into modern Italian. Federico had a strong interest in technology from an early age. He attended a technical high school in Vicenza, I.T.I.S. Alessandro Rossi, and later earned a laurea degree in physics, summa cum laude, from the University of Padua.

Olivetti R&D Labs 
Faggin joined Olivetti aged 19. There he co-designed and led the implementation of a small digital transistor computer with 4 K × 12 bit of magnetic memory (1960). The Olivetti R&D department subsequently developed, one of the world's first programmable desktop electronic calculators, the Olivetti Programma 101 (1964). After this first work experience, Faggin studied physics at the University of Padua and taught the electronics laboratory course for 3rd year physics students in the academic year 1965–1966.

SGS-Fairchild 

In 1967 he joined SGS Fairchild, now STMicroelectronics, in Italy, where he developed its first MOS metal-gate process technology and designed its first two commercial MOS integrated circuits. SGS sent him to California in 1968. When Fairchild sold SGS-Fairchild, Faggin accepted an offer to complete the development of the silicon-gate technology with Fairchild.

Silicon Valley career

Fairchild Semiconductor 

The silicon-gate technology (SGT) is one of the most influential technologies to have fueled the progress of microelectronics since the MOSFET. Without the SGT, the first microprocessor could not have been made during 1970–1971.

In February 1968, Federico Faggin joined Fairchild Semiconductor in Palo Alto where he was the project leader of the MOS silicon-gate technology, a MOSFET with a silicon self-aligned gate, and the inventor of its unique process architecture. The SGT became the basis of all modern NMOS and CMOS integrated circuits. It made possible the creation of MOS semiconductor memory chips during 1969–1970, the first microprocessor during 1970–1971, and the first CCD and EPROM (electrically programmable read-only memory) with floating silicon gates (1970-1971). The SGT replaced the incumbent aluminum-gate MOS technology, and was adopted worldwide within 10 years, eventually making obsolete the original integrated circuits built with bipolar transistors.

Fairchild 3708

At Fairchild, Faggin designed the first commercial integrated circuit using Silicon Gate Technology with self-aligned MOSFET transistors: the Fairchild 3708. The 3708 was an 8-bit analog multiplexer with decoding logic, replacing the equivalent Fairchild 3705 that used metal-gate technology. The 3708 was 5 times faster, had 100 times less junction leakage and was much more reliable than the 3705, demonstrating the superiority of SGT over metal-gate MOS. See also: Faggin, F., Klein T. (1969). "A Faster Generation of MOS Devices With Low Threshold Is Riding The Crest of the New Wave, Silicon-Gate IC's." Electronics, 29 Sept. 1969.

Intel 

Federico Faggin joined Intel from Fairchild in 1970 as the project leader and designer of the MCS-4 family of microprocessors, which included the 4004, the world's first single-chip microprocessor. Fairchild was not taking advantage of the SGT and Faggin wanted to use his new technology to design advanced chips.

The 4004 (1971) was made possible by the advanced capabilities of the silicon gate technology (SGT) being enhanced through the novel random logic chip design methodology that Faggin created at Intel. It was this new methodology, together with his several design innovations, that allowed him to fit the microprocessor in one small chip. A single-chip microprocessor – an idea that was expected to occur many years in the future – became possible in 1971 by using SGT with two additional innovations: (1) "buried contacts" that doubled the circuit density, and (2) the use of bootstrap loads with 2-phase clocks—previously considered impossible with SGT— that improved the speed 5 times, while reducing the chip area by half compared with metal-gate MOS.

The design methodology created by Faggin was utilized for the implementation of all Intel's early microprocessors and later also for Zilog's Z80.

The Intel 4004 – a 4-bit CPU (central processing unit) on a single chip – was a member of a family of 4 custom chips designed for Busicom, a Japanese calculator manufacturer. The other members of the family (constituting the MCS-4 family) were: the 4001, a 2k-bit metal-mask programmable ROM with programmable input-output lines; the 4002, a 320-bit dynamic RAM with a 4-bit output port; and the 4003, a 10-bit serial input and serial/parallel output, static shift register to use as an I/O expander. 
Faggin promoted the idea of broadly marketing the MCS-4 to customers other than Busicom by showing to Intel management how customers could design a control system using the 4004. He designed and built a 4004 tester using the 4004 as the controller of the tester, thus convincing Bob Noyce to renegotiate the exclusivity clause with Busicom that didn't allow Intel to sell the MCS-4 line to other customers.

In 2009, the four contributors to the 4004 were inducted as Fellows of the Computer History Museum. Ted Hoff, head of Application Research Department, formulated the architectural proposal and the instruction set with assistance from Stan Mazor and working in conjunction with Busicom's Masatoshi Shima.  However none of them was a chip designer and none was familiar with the new Silicon Gate Technology (SGT). The silicon design was the essential missing ingredient to making a microprocessor since everything else was already known. Federico Faggin led the project in a different department without Hoff's and Mazor's involvement. Faggin had invented the original SGT at Fairchild Semiconductor in 1968 and provided additional refinements and inventions to make possible the implementation of the 4004 in a single chip. With routine help from Shima, Faggin completed the chip design in January 1971.

The Intel 2102A is a redesign of the Intel 2102 static RAM, where Federico Faggin introduced to Intel, for the first time, the depletion load, combining the silicon gate technology with ionic implantation.  The design was done toward the end of 1973 by Federico Faggin and Dick Pashley. The 2102A was 5 times faster than the 2102, opening a new direction for Intel.

Early Intel microprocessors 

Faggin's silicon design methodology was used for implementing all Intel's early microprocessors.

The Intel 8008 was the world's first single-chip 8-bit CPU and, like the 4004, was built with p-channel SGT. The 8008 development was originally assigned to Hal Feeney in March 1970 but was suspended until the 4004 was completed. It was resumed in January 1971 under Faggin's direction utilizing the basic circuits and methodology he had developed for the 4004, with Hal Feeney doing the chip design. The CPU architecture of the 8008 was originally created by CTC Inc. for the Datapoint 2200 intelligent terminal, in which it was implemented in discrete IC logic.

The Intel 4040 microprocessor (1974) was a much improved, machine-code-compatible version of the 4004 CPU allowing it to interface directly with standard memories and I/O devices. Federico Faggin created the architecture of the 4040 and supervised Tom Innes who did the design work.

The 8080 microprocessor (1974) was the first high-performance 8-bit microprocessor in the market, using the faster n-channel SGT. The 8080 was conceived and designed by Faggin, and designed by Masatoshi Shima under Faggin's supervision. The 8080 was a major improvement over the 8008 architecture, yet it retained software compatibility with it. It was much faster and easier to interface to external memory and I/O devices than the 8008. The high performance and low cost of the 8080 let developers use microprocessors for many new applications, including the forerunners of the personal computer.

When Faggin left Intel at the end of 1974 to found Zilog with Ralph Ungermann, he was R&D department manager responsible for all MOS products, except for dynamic memories.

Zilog 
The Zilog Z80 was the first microprocessor created by Zilog, the first company entirely dedicated to microprocessors. It was started by Federico Faggin and Ralph Ungermann in November 1974. Faggin was Zilog's president and CEO until the end of 1980 and he conceived and designed the Z80 CPU and its family of programmable peripheral components. He also co-designed the CPU whose project leader was Masatoshi Shima. 
The Z80-CPU was a major improvement over the 8080, yet it retained software compatibility with it. Much faster and with more than twice as many registers and instructions of the 8080, it was part of a family of components that included several intelligent peripherals (the Z80-PIO, a programmable parallel input-output controller; the Z80-CTC, a programmable counter-timer; the Z80-SIO, programmable serial communications interface controller, and the Z80-DMA, programmable direct memory access controller). This chip family allowed the design of powerful and low-cost microcomputers with performance comparable to minicomputers. The Z80-CPU had a substantially better bus structure and interrupt structure than the 8080 and could interface directly with dynamic RAM, since it included an internal memory-refresh controller. The Z80 was used in many of the early personal computers, as well as in video game systems such as the MSX, ColecoVision, Sega Master System and Game Boy. The Z80 is still in volume production in 2017 as a core microprocessor in various systems on a chip.

The Zilog Z8 micro controller (1978) was one of the first single-chip microcontrollers in the market. It integrated an 8-bit CPU, RAM, ROM and I/O facilities, sufficient for many control applications. Faggin conceived the Z8 in 1974, soon after he founded Zilog, but then decided to give priority to the Z80. The Z8 was designed in 1976–78 and is still in volume production today (2017).

The Communication CoSystem
The Communication CoSystem (1984). The Cosystem was conceived by Faggin and designed and produced by Cygnet Technologies, Inc., the second startup company of Faggin. Attached to a personal computer and to a standard phone line, the CoSystem could automatically handle all the personal voice and data communications of the user, including electronic mail, database access, computer screen transfers during a voice communication, call record keeping, etc. The patent covering the CoSystem is highly cited in the personal communication field.

Synaptics
In 1986 Faggin co-founded and was CEO of Synaptics until 1999, becoming chairman from 1999 to 2009. Synaptics was initially dedicated to R&D in artificial neural networks for pattern-recognition applications using analog VLSI. Synaptics introduced the I1000, the world's first single-chip optical character recognizer in 1991. In 1994, Synaptics introduced the touchpad to replace the cumbersome trackball then in use in laptop computers. The touchpad was broadly adopted by the industry. Synaptics also introduced the early touchscreens that were eventually adopted for intelligent phones and tablets; applications that now dominate the market. Faggin came up with the general product idea and led a group of engineers who further refined the idea through many brainstorming sessions. Faggin is a co-inventor of ten patents assigned to Synaptics. He is chairman emeritus of Synaptics.

Foveon
During his tenure as president and CEO of Foveon, from 2003 to 2008, Faggin revitalized the company and provided a new technological and business direction resulting in image sensors superior in all critical parameters to the best sensors of the competition, while using approximately half the chip size of competing devices. Faggin also oversaw the successful acquisition of Foveon by the Japanese Sigma Corporation in November 2008.

Federico and Elvia Faggin Foundation
Founded in 2011 the "Federico and Elvia Faggin Foundation" supports the scientific study of consciousness at US universities and research institutes.  The purpose of the Foundation is to advance the understanding of consciousness through theoretical and experimental research.  Faggin's interest in consciousness has his roots in the study of artificial neural networks at Synaptics, a company he started in 1986, that prompted his inquiry into whether or not it is possible to build a conscious computer.

Original documents

On the MOS Silicon Gate Technology (SGT) and the Fairchild 3708 (The first application of SGT)
Faggin, F., Klein, T., and Vadasz, L.: Insulated Gate Field Effect Transistor Integrated Circuits with Silicon Gates. The Silicon Gate Technology with self-aligned gates was presented by its developer Federico Faggin at the IEEE International Electron Device Meeting on 23 October 1968, in Washington D.C. This new technology empowered the design of dynamic RAM memories, non-volatile memories, CCD sensors and the microprocessor.
Federico Faggin and Thomas Klein.: "A Faster Generation of MOS Devices with Low Thresholds is Riding the Crest of the New Wave, Silicon-Gate IC's".  The article published in Electronics (29 September 1969) introduces the Fairchild 3708, the world's first commercial integrated circuit using Silicon Gate Technology, designed by Federico Faggin at Fairchild in 1968.
F. Faggin, T. Klein: Silicon-Gate Technology.  "Solid State Electronics", 1970, Vo. 13, pp. 1125–1144

On the Intel 4004 microprocessor
F. Faggin and M. E. Hoff: "Standard Parts and Custom Design Merge in a Four-chip Processor Kit". Electronics, 24 April 1972
F. Faggin, et al.: "The MCS-4 An LSI Microcomputer System".  IEEE 1972 Region Six Conference

Faggin, Federico; Capocaccia, F. "A New Integrated MOS Shift Register", Proceedings XV International Electronics Scientific Congress, Rome, April 1968, pp. 143–152. This paper describes a novel static MOS shift register, developed at SGS-Fairchild (now ST Micro) at the end of 1967, before Federico Faggin joined Fairchild's R&D in Palo Alto (Ca) in February 1968. Faggin later used this new shift register in the MCS-4 chips, including the 4004.
Initials F.F. (Federico Faggin) on the 4004 design (1971). The 4004 bears the initials F.F. of its designer, Federico Faggin, etched on one corner of the chip. Signing the chip was a spontaneous gesture of proud authorship and was also an original idea imitated after him by many Intel designers.
Busicom 141-PF Printing Calculator Engineering Prototype (1971). (Gift of Federico Faggin to the Computer History Museum, Mountain View, CA). The CHM collection catalog shows pictures of the engineering prototype of the Busicom 141-PF desktop calculator. The engineering prototype used the world's first microprocessor to have ever been produced. This one-of-a-kind prototype was a personal present by Busicom's president Mr. Yoshio Kojima to Federico Faggin for his successful leadership of the design and development of the 4004 and three other memory and I/O chips (the MCS-4 chipset). After keeping it in his home for 25 years, Faggin donated it to the CHM in 1996.

Publications

Articles
"The Birth of the Microprocessor" by Federico Faggin.  Byte, March 1992, Vol.17 No.3, pp. 145–150.
"The History of the 4004"  by Federico Faggin, Marcian E. Hoff Jr., Stanley Mazor, Masatoshi Shima.  IEEE Micro, December 1996, Volume 16 Number 6.
"The 4004 microprocessor of Faggin, Hoff, Mazor, and Shima". IEEE Solid State Circuits Magazine, Winter 2009 Vol.1 No.1.
"The MOS silicon gate technology and the first microprocessors" by Federico Faggin. La Rivista del Nuovo Cimento, year 2015, issue   12-December. SIF (Italian Physical Society)
"How we made the microprocessor" by Federico Faggin. Nature Electronics, Vol. 1, January 2018.  Published online: 8 January 2018
"Hard Problem and Free Will: an information-theoretical approach" by Giacomo Mauro D'Ariano and Federico Faggin. arXiv:2012.06580 28Jan2021

Books
 Silicon: From the Invention of the Microprocessor to the New Science of Consciousness by Federico Faggin. Waterside Productions (February 2021)
  Artificial Intelligence Versus Natural Intelligence. Springer International Publishing, January 2022
  Irriducibile - La coscienza, la vita, i computer e la nostra natura by Federico Faggin. Mondadori (Agosto 2022) "Sono convinto che quando capiremo che la fisica quantistica non descrive la realtà esteriore ma quella interiore essa cesserà di essere incomprensibile.”

Awards

 1988: Marconi International Fellowship Award "for his pioneering contributions to the implementation of the microprocessor, a principal building block of modern telecommunications"
 1988: Gold Medal for Science and Technology from the Italian Prime Minister
 1988: title of "Grande Ufficiale" from the President of the Italian Republic
 1994: W. Wallace McDowell Award "For the development of the Silicon Gate Process, and the first commercial microprocessor."
 1994: Laurea honoris causa in Computer Science from the University of Milan (Italy).
 1996: Ronald H. Brown American Innovator Award, with M. Hoff and S. Mazor
 1996: a Lifetime Achievement Award by P.C. Magazine for "technical excellence".
 1997: Kyoto Prize, with M. Hoff, S. Mazor and M. Shima
 1996: inducted into National Inventors Hall of Fame, with M. Hoff and S. Mazor 
 1997: George R. Stibitz Computer Pioneer Award by the American Computer Museum, with M. Hoff and S. Mazor
 1997: Masi Civilta' Veneta Prize
 2001: Dr. Robert Noyce Memorial Award by the Semiconductor Industry Association, with M. Hoff and S. Mazor
 2003: Laurea honoris causa in Electronic Engineering from the University of Rome Tor Vergata (Italy)
 2003: AeA/Stanford Executive Institute Award for Outstanding Achievement in the High Tech Industry by an Alumnus
 2006: European Inventor of the Year Lifetime Achievement Award by EPO (European Patent Office)
 2007: Laurea honoris causa in Electronic Engineering from the University of Pavia (Italy)
 2008: Laurea honoris causa in Electronic Engineering from the University of Palermo (Italy)
 2009: Laurea honoris causa in Computer Sciences from the University of Verona (Italy)
 2009: Fellow of the Computer History Museum "for his work as part of the team that developed the Intel 4004, the world's first commercial microprocessor."
 2009: National Medal of Technology and Innovation from U.S. President Barack Obama
 2011: The 2011 George R. Stibitz Lifetime Achievement Award by the American Computer Museum (Bozeman, MT): "For foundational contributions to the development of the modern technological world, including the MOS silicon gate technology that led to the realization of the world's first Microprocessor in 1971."
 2019: Knight Grand Cross of the Order of Merit of the Italian Republic from the President of the Italian Republic Sergio Mattarella

Source for the above-mentioned awards:

 2012: Global Information Technology Award from the President of Armenia.
 2012: Honorary PhD from the Polytechnic University (Armenia)
 2012: Premio Franca Florio, given by Ministro Francesco Profumo and Prof. Ing. Patrizia Livreri
 2013: Honorary PhD in science from Chapman University (CA)
 2014: Enrico Fermi Award, given by the Italian Society of Physics: "For the invention of the MOS silicon gate technology that led him to the realization in 1971 of the first modern microprocessor."
 2018:  2018 IEEE Italy Section Honorary Award to Federico Faggin for his outstanding contributions to the self aligned MOS silicon gate theory & technology and to the development of the first microprocessor
 2018:  2018 AAAS Fellow by the American Association for the Advancement of Science
 2019:  PhD (Dottorato di ricerca) honoris causa in computer engineering from the University of Pisa (Italy) Università di Pisa.

References

External links

 The Intel 4004 Microprocessor and the Silicon Gate Technology, A testimonial from Federico Faggin, designer of the 4004 and developer of its enabling technology Federico Faggin personally gives details, history and nitty-gritty details about the Intel 4004's development and his inventions, innovations and ideas that made it all possible.
 "Executive Profile" from Foveon.com
 IEEE Global History Network Biography of Federico Faggin
 Oral History of Federico Faggin Computer History Museum. Recorded 2004-05
 Busicom Calculator Engineering Prototype (Gift of Federico Faggin to the Computer History Museum, Mountain View, California).
 
 "Computers Still No Match for Human Intelligence" Video and article interview with Federico Faggin 40 years after the release of the Intel 4004 microprocessor

1941 births
20th-century American businesspeople
20th-century American engineers
American computer scientists
European Inventor Award winners
20th-century Italian businesspeople
Italian computer scientists
Italian emigrants to the United States
20th-century Italian engineers
20th-century Italian inventors
Intel people
Kyoto laureates in Advanced Technology
Living people
MOSFETs
Knights Grand Cross of the Order of Merit of the Italian Republic
National Medal of Technology recipients
People from Vicenza
Silicon Valley people
University of Padua alumni